Since the 1968 Summer Olympics did not feature tennis as an official sport, two unofficial tournaments were held during the Games: a Demonstration tournament and an Exhibition tournament.

The Exhibition tournament was played from 24 to 26 October 1968 on the clay courts of the Chapultepec Sports Center in Mexico City, Mexico. All matches were played at best-of-three sets; since the tiebreak rule wasn't implemented until the 1970s, a player had to win a set by a two-game margin in case of a 6–6 draw. Due to the short length of the tournament, no third-place match was played, and both semifinal losers received bronze medals.

American Peaches Bartkowicz won the title by defeating her compatriot Julie Heldman 6–3, 6–2 in the final. Both Brazilian Suzana Petersen and Ecuatorian María Eugenia Guzmán won bronze medals.

Seeds
Both seeds received a bye into the quarterfinals.

Draw

References

External links
 Official Results Archive (ITF)

Exhibition
Women's events at the 1968 Summer Olympics
Olym